Ignace Gill (March 15, 1808 – September 1, 1865) was a businessman and political figure in Canada East.

He was born in Saint-François-du-Lac, Lower Canada in 1808. He worked as a clerk in stores at Baie-du-Febvre and then operated his own store at Saint-François-de-Sales from around 1830 to 1850. He was named justice of the peace in 1835. Gill later became involved in the timber trade and administered the Pierreville seigneury for François-Xavier Biron. He also served as postmaster at Saint-François-du-Lac. In 1854, he was elected to the Legislative Assembly of the Province of Canada for Yamaska and was reelected in 1857. He served as mayor of Saint-Thomas-de-Pierreville in 1862–3.

He died in Saint-Thomas-de-Pierreville in 1865.

His son Charles-Ignace later represented Yamaska in the Canadian House of Commons and the Quebec legislative assembly.

External links
 
 Biography at the Dictionary of Canadian Biography Online

1808 births
1865 deaths
Members of the Legislative Assembly of the Province of Canada from Canada East
Mayors of places in Quebec
Canadian justices of the peace